Jurmana is a 1996 Indian Hindi-language action film produced by Kalyaani Singh, presented by Maann Singh, and directed by T L V Prasad, starring Mithun Chakraborty, Ronit Roy, Rambha, Ashwini Bhave, Kiran Kumar, Shakti Kapoor and Raza Murad.

Plot 
A family action film about Love between Inspector Vijay Saxena and Priya Kumari Tiwari. Inspector Vijay Saxena and Priya Kumari Tiwari are in love. The only obstacle is that Priya's dad is wealthy and the Chief Minister of the state, while Vijay's background is lower middle-class. Humiliated by Tiwari, Vijay marries advocate Kiran, and together they give birth to a daughter named Bobby. Kiran represents a number of defendants who are charged by the police, and is always on hand to secure their release, and this causes some acrimony in their marriage. Then an unmarried Priya re-enters Vijay's life, and this time she intends to stay close to this family. Tragedy strikes the Saxena family when Kiran is killed by assailants. With the police having no clues as to who her killers are, Vijay takes it upon himself to bring the culprits to justice. It is then he finds out that Bobby has been kidnapped, and the only way he can save her is by turning himself in to her kidnappers.

Cast 
 Mithun Chakraborty as Police Inspector Vijay Saxena
 Rambha as Priya Kumari Saxena Khandan 
 Shakti Kapoor as J.J. 
 Ronit Roy as Sanjay Saxena (Vijay's brother)
 Kanchan as Pooja
 Anil Nagrath as Police Commissioner
 Shashi Kiran as Police Inspector
 Vishwajeet Pradhan as J.J.’s brother
 Raza Murad as Chief Minister Tiwari
 Ashwini Bhave as Advocate Kiran Saxena
 Kiran Kumar as Police Commissioner
 Gavin Packard as Rona
 Akela Singh
 Baby Nikita as Bobby
 Brijesh Tiwari
 Anup Biswas

Music
 "Tere Pyar Mein Dil Ye" - Udit Narayan, Sadhana Sargam
 "Dil Deewana Ho Gaya" - Kavita Krishnamurthy
 "Sun Meri Jaane Jaana" - Udit Narayan, Aditya Narayan, Kalyaani Singh
 "Sard Raaton Mein Yu" - Poornima
 "Teri Patli Kamar" - Udit Narayan
 "Mirchi Re Mirchi" - Sudesh Bhosle, Poornima

Box office
Made on a budget of  crore, Jurmana grossed  crore at the worldwide box office.

External links

References

1990s Hindi-language films
1996 films
Mithun's Dream Factory films
Films shot in Ooty
Films scored by Dilip Sen-Sameer Sen
Indian action films